Happy Valley Tianjin is a theme park in Dongli District, Tianjin, China. Opened on 27 July 2013, it is the sixth installation of the Happy Valley theme park chain.

Notable rides

References 

Buildings and structures in Tianjin
Tourist attractions in Tianjin
2013 establishments in China
Amusement parks opened in 2013
Tianjin